Tesla Truck may refer to:

 Tesla Semi, big rig, class-8 semi-trailer-tractor-unit
 Tesla Cybertruck (Cybrtrk), pickup truck, light truck grade

See also

 Tesla (disambiguation)
 Battery electric truck
 Electric truck